Concern Tractor Plants (CTP) is a leading Russian machine building company. CTP is  one of the largest heavy mechanical engineering companies in the world.

Overview
The company produces machinery for the industrial, military, agricultural, municipal building and railway sectors, including tractors, harvesting machinery, components and spare parts. CTP consolidates 14 industrial enterprises, three trading-service companies, a number of specialized Research and development offices and a Scientific Research Institute. The total number of employees is approximately 45,000 people. CTP operates in more than 40 countries worldwide. In 2007, the cumulative annual sales volume exceeded $1.35 billion, having increased 31.5 percent for the year. The company's headquarters are located in Cheboksary. Most of the company's factories are located in Russia.

In 2009, the holding company Machinery & Industrial Group N.V. placed shares on the Frankfurt Stock Exchange in the form of Global Depositary Receipts issued by Deutsche Bank. However, as of 2014, the sole shareholder of the company is Vnesheconombank.

Structure
Companies of the holding:
 Altai Motor Plant, JSC
 Vladimir Motor and Tractor Plant, Ltd.
 Volgograd Machine Building Company, Ltd.
 Zauralsky Blacksmith’s Foundry, Ltd.
 Krasnoyarsk Combine Harvester Plant, JSC
 Kraslesmash, JSC
 Kurganmashzavod, JSC
 Lipetsk Caterpillar Tractor Plant, Ltd.
 Onezhsky Tractor Plant, Ltd.
 Promtractor, JSC
 Promtractor-Wagon, CJSC
 Promtractor-Promlit, Ltd
 SAREX, JSC
 VgTZ Tractor Company, JSC
 Cheboksary Aggregate Works, JSC and Cheboksary Industrial Tractor Plant ChETRA
 Silvatec Skovmaskiner A/S
 Vogel&Noot Landmaschinen GmbH
 MIKONT, Ltd.
 Scientific Research Institute of Steel, JSC
 Special Machine Building Design Bureau, JSC
 Innovative Product Plant KTZ, Ltd.

References

External links
 

 
Military vehicle manufacturers
Holding companies of Russia
Russian brands
Companies based in Chuvashia